Donald Jerome Driver (born February 2, 1975) is an American former professional football player who was a  wide receiver for the Green Bay Packers of the National Football League (NFL). After playing college football for Alcorn State University, Driver was picked by Green Bay in the seventh round of the 1999 NFL Draft. He spent his entire 14-season NFL career with the Packers and holds the franchise's all-time records for most career receptions and receiving yards.  Driver was a member of the Packers team that won Super Bowl XLV over the Pittsburgh Steelers. Every year in Cleveland, Driver holds the Donald Driver Football Camp for local kids which is held at the Cleveland High School Football field. Upon retirement, he won season 14 of Dancing with the Stars.

Early life
Driver was born in Houston, Texas, on February 2, 1975. He was the middle child of five siblings. Driver's parents, Marvin Driver Jr. and Faye Gray, divorced when he was just a young boy. Donald had a tough childhood living out of a U-Haul truck for a period of time during his early teens, after a collection agency confiscated his family's possessions. Donald spent multiple nights in motel rooms that his mother had purchased with food stamps. Driver and his older brother Marvin III, began stealing cars and selling drugs during their teenage years in order make it from day to day. Driver was quoted by USA Today stating, "You try to do anything you can to provide for your family." At the age of 14 years, Donald would move in with his grandmother, Betty Lofton. This was the point of time where his life started to turn around.

Driver shone as an athlete early in his years at Milby High School in Houston. He lettered four times each in track, football, basketball and baseball. He was a Texas All-State honorable mention in football, where he played at the wide receiver, defensive back, and kickoff return positions.

College career
Driver attended Alcorn State University in Mississippi, where he lettered in both football and track & field. He finished his college football career at Alcorn State with 88 receptions for 1993 yards (19.69 yards per catch). He was a five-time "Athlete of the Year" in his conference for his track and football prowess.

Driver is a member of Alpha Phi Alpha fraternity.

Track and field
Driver is a decorated track athlete. He is an Olympic-class high jumper, being able to jump . He qualified for the 1996 Olympic Field Trials in the high jump.

He competed for the Alcorn State Braves track team, where he excelled in the high jump and earned all-conference honors his senior year. He leaped 2.30 meters in the high jump, 15.62 meters in the triple jump and 7.75 meters in the long jump.

Professional career
Driver was drafted by the Green Bay Packers in the 7th round of the 1999 NFL Draft with the 213th overall pick.  He spent his entire career with the Packers.

Green Bay Packers (1999–2012)

Known as one of the most consistent wide receivers in the game, Driver was not particularly productive his first three seasons in Green Bay (1999–2001), as he was behind wide receivers Antonio Freeman and Corey Bradford on the depth chart. With the departure of Freeman and Bradford, Driver blossomed in a starting role.

Driver was solid throughout his career, often posting 1,000 receiving yards in a season. Driver had the most catches in the NFL in the middle of the field in 2006. He set a career best for yards on November 12, 2006, when he caught six passes for 191 yards, including an 82-yard touchdown against the Minnesota Vikings. Driver finished the 2006 season in the top five of the league in reception yardage with 1,295 yards. He also recorded the most receptions in his career with 92 of them, earning a spot in the 2007 Pro Bowl.
On December 16, 2007, during a 33–14 victory over the St. Louis Rams, veteran Green Bay quarterback Brett Favre broke Dan Marino's all-time record mark of 61,361 career passing yards. The new record came on a seven-yard completion to Driver. Driver was selected for the 2008 Pro Bowl.

In the NFC Championship game on January 20, 2008, against the New York Giants, Driver had the longest play in the playoffs of the Packers' franchise history with a 90-yard touchdown catch from Favre.

On October 18, 2009, Driver became the Green Bay Packers' all-time leading receiver in catches, with 596. He went on to catch six more balls for 107 yards in a 26–0 home victory over the Detroit Lions. On September 8, 2011, Driver caught four balls for 41 yards in the opening game against the New Orleans Saints and was only one yard short of becoming the Packers' all-time leader in receiving yards. Driver finally broke the Packers' all-time receiving yardage record on September 18, 2011, against the Carolina Panthers after he caught a 10-yard pass from Aaron Rodgers, surpassing James Lofton.

On February 6, 2011, Driver was injured on his second reception of Super Bowl XLV. Out with an ankle sprain, Driver returned to the game in the end for the final plays as the Packers went on to beat the Pittsburgh Steelers 31–25.  Driver finished Super Bowl XLV with two receptions for 28 yards. Despite losing playing time to Greg Jennings and Jordy Nelson, Driver was a veteran presence for a young Packers receiving corps led by NFL MVP QB Aaron Rodgers in the twilight of Driver’s career.

Retirement
On January 31, 2013, Driver announced his retirement on ESPN2 Mike and Mike in the Morning after spending his entire career (14 seasons) with the Green Bay Packers. He missed only four games in his career, the last one being November 18, 2012.

On February 6, 2013, the Green Bay Packers hosted a public retirement ceremony for Driver. This was the first public retirement ceremony ever held for a Packers player. It was held in the Lambeau Field Atrium with comments made by Mark Murphy, Ted Thompson, Mike McCarthy, and Driver. It was sold out in 14 minutes and hundreds of fans were in attendance. The mayor of Green Bay presented Driver with a key to the city and announced that the receiver statue that previously resided in front of the former Packers Hall of Fame and is now in downtown Green Bay would be refurbished, with the receiver wearing a No. 80 Driver jersey. The street leading to the statue was also renamed "Donald Driver Way."

On July 22, 2017, Driver was inducted into the Green Bay Packers Hall of Fame.

NFL career statistics

Regular season

Postseason

Personal life

Driver is married to Betina Driver. They have three children: Cristian, Christina, and Charity. His son Cristian is a wide receiver for Penn State. Driver is a Christian.

Since 2004, Driver has co-hosted the statewide Packer analysis television series Inside the Huddle with Donald Driver with WLUK-TV's sports director Drew Smith.  Every Thursday Donald talks football with John Mercure on Wisconsin's Afternoon News with John Mercure on AM 620 WTMJ. He previously served as host to the annual Offense vs. Defense softball game featuring members of the Green Bay Packers.

As a well-known athlete in the state of Wisconsin, Driver has been featured in marketing campaigns for companies such as McDonald's, AirTran Airways, Kwik Trip, Goodwill, Jani-King and Time Warner Cable.

Throughout his career, Driver has been very active off the field, making over 300 charitable appearances since his rookie season in 1999. In the spring of 2001, Donald and his wife Betina created the "Donald Driver Foundation", which offers assistance to ill children with unmanageable hospital bills, provides housing for the homeless, and donates to a variety of local charities. In December 2003, the foundation put two previously homeless families in new, fully furnished homes.

Donald has also donated much of his time and efforts to such institutions as Children's Hospital of Wisconsin and Goodwill Industries. In 2001, Driver was awarded the "Community Service Award" by the Green Bay Chamber of Commerce in recognition of his outstanding community involvement. In 2005, he was awarded the Ed Block Courage award by his Green Bay teammates. Most recently, Driver was named the 2013 AMVETS Humanitarian of the Year.

Driver is also the author of three children's books, Quickie Handles a Loss, Quickie Makes the Team, and Quickie Goes to the Big Game. The books are based on Driver's bedtime storytelling to his three children, and are sold statewide in Wisconsin through bookstores, participating Goodwill locations, the Packer Pro Shop and on his website.  He has stated that "Quickie" is a nickname his mother gave him because, when she would chase him around the house, she could never catch him. In the Fall of 2013, Driver released his official memoir, Driven, which included many personal stories about both his childhood and career with the Packers that he had never shared before and it made the New York Best Seller list. Two weeks after the book's release, it made the New York Times Bestsellers list. In the Summer of 2017, Driver released a health and fitness book, The 3D Body Revolution: The Ultimate Workout + Nutrition Blueprint to Get Healthy and Lean, which featured 25 recipes and 36 exercises illustrated with clear step-by-step photos.  Following its release, The 3D Body Revolution was featured as a #1 new release in Amazon's exercise injuries and rehabilitation category.

On February 28, 2012, it was announced that Driver would join the cast of Dancing with the Stars for season 14, paired with professional dance partner Peta Murgatroyd. Driver's high energy and athleticism were repeatedly praised by the judges, though Driver was also notorious for not getting a perfect score, until their freestyle, from the judges. Driver and Murgatroyd made it all the way to the finale, and despite competitions from fellow finalists William Levy's high fanbase and Katherine Jenkins' consistently high scores, Driver and Murgatroyd were declared winners on the season finale on May 22, 2012.

On June 15, 2013, Driver received a street in his name and a statue dedicated in his honor. The statue is located on the corner of Dousman Street and Donald Driver Way (formerly Pearl Street) in downtown Green Bay.

In March 2014, Donald Driver created the Donald Driver Driven To Achieve Awards. Since then, the Driven to Achieve Awards have honored 18 outstanding recipients and have given away over $1 million.

Driver currently splits his time between his home state of Texas and Milwaukee, Wisconsin, purchasing a $3 million Milwaukee loft in 2022 from fellow Wisconsin athlete Jabari Parker. He operates a nonprofit called the Donald Driver Foundation in both Wisconsin and Texas and serves as the current cultural ambassador for Milwaukee's Marcus Center for the Performing Arts, in addition to business ventures.

References

External links

Green Bay Packers biography
Donald Driver Foundation
Donald Driver official website
Donald Driver TV show website
Donald Driver: More Than a Game

1975 births
Living people
African-American Christians
African-American players of American football
Alcorn State Braves football players
American football wide receivers
Dancing with the Stars (American TV series) winners
Green Bay Packers players
National Conference Pro Bowl players
Participants in American reality television series
Players of American football from Houston
Writers from Houston
21st-century African-American sportspeople
20th-century African-American sportspeople
10,000 receiving yards club
Ed Block Courage Award recipients